The Argentine legislative elections of 1985 were held on 3 November. Voters chose their legislators and, with a turnout of 83.8%.

Background

Raúl Alfonsín's 1983 inaugural had ushered in a new beginning for Argentina in significant ways, chief among them a new relationship between the Argentine military and government. Economic policy continued to dominate political dynamics, however, a concern exacerbated by the economic crisis inherited from the previous regime. The nation's leading labor union, the CGT was close to Alfonsín's chief opposition, the Justicialist Party, and the tension between the CGT and Alfonsín so evident during 1984 (despite the President's populist early policies) turned to hostility after he replaced the pragmatic Bernardo Grinspun for the more conservative Juan Sourrouille in February 1985.  Sorrouille curtailed his predecessor's wage indexation policy (amid 25% monthly inflation), leading to a sudden decline in real wages. Social discontent was compounded by military objections to sharp budget cutbacks, and bomb threats became frequent.

Fulfilling a 1983 campaign promise, Alfonsín reacted to military unwillingness to court-martial those guilty of Dirty War abuses (in which up to 30,000 mostly non-violent dissidents perished) by advancing a Trial of the Juntas, whose first hearings were held in April. This bold move was complemented by Sourrouille's June enactment of the Austral Plan, whose centerpiece, the Argentine austral would replace the worthless peso argentino at 1,000 to one. Inflation, which had reached 30% a month in June (1,130% for the year), fell to 2% by August and, though a wage freeze prevented real incomes from rising, these new inflation rates (the lowest since 1974) led to quick recovery from a sharp recession early in the year.  Alfonsín enjoyed a 70% job approval rating by the time votes headed to the polls in early November, though he owed none of it to his economic policies, which were supported by only 30% of the public. The strong showing for Alfonsín's centrist UCR resulted, instead, from the Dirty War trial, a risky and daring initiative which had gathered international attention and was, by then, in its closing phase.

Results

Results by province

References

1985
1985 elections in Argentina
Presidency of Raúl Alfonsín